Brookhaven was a station stop along the Montauk Branch of the Long Island Rail Road located at Bridge Street and Old Stump Road (former Suffolk County Route 21).

History
It first opened around 1884 by the Brooklyn and Montauk Railroad. In May 1958, the Long Island Rail Road (LIRR) applied to the New York State Public Service Commission for permission to close Brookhaven, East Moriches , and Eastport. The LIRR sought to close the three stations due to very low ridership. A ridership survey conducted in September 1957 found no passengers at Brookhaven. The station closed on October 6, 1958. The former freight house has been moved to various private locations since 1958, and modified by each owner.

References

External links
Historic image of Brookhaven Station (Arrt's Arrchives)
Archeological Site Inventory Form Brookhaven Railroad Station
PSC Decision Brings Up Colorful History of B'haven, E'port, EM Stations (Patchogue Advance; September 25, 1958)

Former Long Island Rail Road stations in Suffolk County, New York
Railway stations in the United States opened in 1884
Railway stations closed in 1958
1958 disestablishments in New York (state)